The Military ranks of Libya are the military insignia used by the Libyan Armed Forces. The rank insignia was inspired by the armed forces of the United Kingdom, which trained the forces of the Kingdom of Libya during its Allied occupation up until independence. In 2016, the rank of Field marshal was instituted and awarded to Khalifa Haftar.

Commissioned officer ranks
The rank insignia of commissioned officers.

Other ranks
The rank insignia of non-commissioned officers and enlisted personnel.

References

External links
 

Libya
Military of Libya
Libya